The Reform Club in Spring Gardens, Manchester, England, is a former gentlemen's club dating from the Victorian era. Built in 1870–1871 in the Venetian Gothic style, it was designed by Edward Salomons, in collaboration with an Irish architect, John Philpot Jones. Claire Hartwell, in her Manchester Pevsner City Guide considers  the club Salomon’s "best city-centre building" and it has a Grade II* heritage designation. The contract for construction was awarded to Mr Nield, a Manchester builder, and had a value of £20,000. The Reform was constructed as the club house for Manchester's Liberal Party, and was opened by Granville Leveson-Gower, 2nd Earl Granville, Liberal Foreign Secretary, on October 19, 1871.

The building is constructed of sandstone ashlar with polychrome dressings and a hipped slate roof. It is of three storeys with elaborate corner turrets, oriel windows and balconies. The main entrance has extensive masonry carving, with gargoyles and “winged beasts". The interior contains a "fine” staircase, a two-storey main dining room, and a very large billiard room on the third floor, which runs the entire length of the building. The hall and staircase have linenfold panelling.

Declining membership in the late 20th century led the club to merge with the Engineers' Club in 1967 to form the Manchester Club, but this also failed to prove financially viable and was wound up in 1988. The club's records are held at the John Rylands Library, Deansgate. The building is now a restaurant and bar.

See also

Grade II* listed buildings in Greater Manchester
Listed buildings in Manchester-M2

Notes

References

Grade II* listed buildings in Manchester
Gothic Revival architecture in Greater Manchester
Venetian Gothic architecture in the United Kingdom
Buildings and structures completed in 1871